Pyrgo may refer to:
Pyrgo Park, Havering, London, England
Pyrgo (genus), a foraminifer genus in the subfamily Quinqueloculininae
Pyrgo (mythology) (Πυργώ), the first wife of Alcathous, son of Pelops in Greek mythology

See also
Pirgo, royal residence of King Henry VIII
Pyrgos (disambiguation)